Vasily Kirillovich Trediakovsky (in Astrakhan –  in Saint Petersburg) was a Russian poet, essayist and playwright who helped lay the foundations of classical Russian literature.

Trediakovsky was a Russian literary theoretician and poet whose writings contributed to the classical foundations of Russian literature. The son of a poor priest, Trediakovsky became the first Russian commoner to receive a humanistic education abroad, at the Sorbonne in Paris (1727–30) where he studied philosophy, linguistics and mathematics. Soon after his return to Russia he became acting secretary of the Academy of Sciences and de facto court poet.

In 1735 Trediakovsky published Новый и краткий способ к сложенью российских стихов ("A new and brief way for composing of Russian verses"), a highly theoretical work for which he is best remembered. It discussed for the first time in Russian literature such poetic genres as the sonnet, the rondeau, the madrigal, and the ode. In 1748 appeared his Разговор об орфографии ("A Conversation on Orthography"), the first study of the phonetic structure of the Russian language. He continued his advocacy of poetic reform in О древней, средней и новой российской поезии (1752; "On Ancient, Middle, and New Russian Poetry").

Trediakovsky was also a prolific translator of classical authors, medieval philosophers, and French literature. His translations frequently aroused the ire of the censors, and he fell into disfavour with his Academy superiors and conservative court circles. In 1759 he was dismissed from the Academy. His last major work was a translation of François Fénelon's Les aventures de Telemaque (1766; Tilemakhida), which he rendered in Russian hexameters. His works marked the transition from syllabic versification to metric verse, more suited to the sound of the Russian tongue.

In 1740, Trediakovsky received a physical beating at the hand of the imperial minister Artemy Volynsky. Volynsky was arrested on charges of conspiracy and misconduct, but Trediakovsky became, "a subject of constant mockery", according to Elif Batuman: "His very propensity for receiving physical abuse became a popular comic premise."

See also 
 Mikhail Lomonosov, who created the basis of the modern Russian literary language

References 

1703 births
1769 deaths
University of Paris alumni
Russian male poets
Full members of the Saint Petersburg Academy of Sciences
Orthographers
18th-century translators from the Russian Empire
18th-century poets from the Russian Empire